Passiflora linda is a species of plant in the family Passifloraceae. It is endemic to Ecuador.  The species was named in honor of botanist Linda Katherine Escobar.

References

linda
Endemic flora of Ecuador
Endangered plants
Taxonomy articles created by Polbot